Steven A. Cook is the Eni Enrico Mattei senior fellow for Middle East and Africa studies at the Council on Foreign Relations (CFR). He is the author of False Dawn: Protest, Democracy, and Violence in the New Middle East (Oxford University Press, 2017). He is also the author of The Struggle for Egypt: From Nasser to Tahrir Square (Oxford University Press, 2011)  and Ruling But Not Governing: The Military and Political Development in Egypt, Algeria, and Turkey (Johns Hopkins University Press, 2007). Cook contributes regularly to foreign policy journals such as Foreign Affairs, Foreign Policy, The Atlantic, and The New Republic. He also runs a blog about Middle Eastern politics and history.

Academic background and honors

Cook received his undergraduate degree in International Studies from Vassar College in 1990, a Masters in International Affairs from the Paul H. Nitze School of Advanced International Studies at Johns Hopkins University in 1995, and a PhD in Political Science from the University of Pennsylvania in 2003. Prior to joining CFR, Cook held fellowships at the Brookings Institution (2001–2002) and the Institute of Turkish Studies Research and Writing Fellowship (2001–2002). In 1999, he was a recipient of the Boren Fellowship to Turkey and Egypt.

Experience 
Cook travels to the Middle East, usually Turkey and Egypt, several times a year and has lived in Cairo, Damascus, Jerusalem, Ankara, and Ramallah. He knows three languages: English, Arabic, and Turkish. His research is primarily steeped in civil-military relations in the Middle East and he appears frequently on television and radio interviews to provide expert commentary on unfolding current events in the Middle East.

Published works
 Books
 False Dawn: Protest, Democracy, and Violence in the New Middle East 2017
 The Struggle for Egypt: From Nasser to Tahrir Square Fall 2011
 Ruling But Not Governing: The Military and Political Development in Egypt, Algeria, and Turkey 2007

Op-eds
 Tarnished Brass, Foreign Policy, August 2, 2011
 America's Radical Idealists Strike Again, The American Interest, July, 2011
 Arab Spring, Turkish Fall Foreign Policy, May 5, 2011
 After The Arab Spring , The Atlantic, March 28, 2011
 America Shouldn't Hijack Egypt's Revolution , Foreign Policy, March 9, 2011

Articles
 The U.S.-Egyptian Break Up, Foreign Affairs, February 2, 2011
 Egypt's Hero?, Foreign Affairs, March 26, 2010
 The Third Intifada, The New Republic, November 16, 2009
 Adrift on the Nile, Foreign Affairs, March/April 2009

Interviews
 More Isolated al-Qaeda In The Mideast , Council on Foreign Relations, May 2, 2011
 Egypt's Referendum: Nervous Steps Forward , Council on Foreign Relations, March 21, 2011
 U.S.-Israeli Relations: Where Do They Go From Here?, PBS NewsHour, March 25, 2010
 Tentative Talks Resume In The Mideast, Worldfocus, March 9, 2010
 Hosni Mubarak Meets with President Obama, Charlie Rose (TV series), August 18, 2009
 July 2006 War Between Lebanon And Israel, Good Morning America, Summer 2006

References

External links 
 Expert page at Council on Foreign Relations
 

American foreign policy writers
American male non-fiction writers
Vassar College alumni
Paul H. Nitze School of Advanced International Studies alumni
University of Pennsylvania alumni
Living people
Year of birth missing (living people)